Gabrielle Marie Hughes (born October 4, 1999) is an American women's ice hockey player for the Minnesota Duluth Bulldogs. She was a Top-3 Finalist for the Patty Kazmaier Award in 2022.

Playing career 
Hughes attended Centennial High School where she collected 315 points. She was an assistant captain her junior and senior year. In 2018, she was a top-five finalist for the Minnesota Ms. Hockey Award. She was the 2018 Star Tribune Metro Player of the Year, a two-time All-State selection, an East Metro Girl Hockey Player of the Year finalist as a junior, the 2018 East Metro Player of the Year, and a two time Star Tribune All-Metro Team honoree (Third Team in 2016-17 and Second Team in 2015–16).

Collegiate 
Hughes plays for Minnesota Duluth Bulldogs and was an assistant captain her senior year. She has totaled 168 points. She was a Top-3 Finalist for the Patty Kazmaier Award in 2022. She was the third freshmen in UMD history to lead the team in scoring as a rookie. She was named to the 2018-19 All-WCHA Third Team and the 2018-19 All-WCHA Rookie Team. She ranked seventh in the WCHA in scoring and second among all rookies, as well as fifth in the NCAA among all freshmen, and was selected to the USCHO All-Rookie Team. She was part of the All-WCHA Second Team and was ranked fifth in the WCHA in points and second in the conference with five game-winning goals. Her 51 points ranked  tenth overall in the NCAA. She was part of the 2019-20 WCHA All-Academic Team. She scored her 100th career point on Jan. 30, 2021 against St. Cloud, making her the  22nd Bulldog to hit the milestone. She was named to the All-WCHA Second Team for a second consecutive year, and finished fifth in scoring in the WCHA.

International play 
She represented the United States at the 2017 IIHF World Women's U18 Championship where she won a gold medal. She was also a member of the 2016 U.S. Women's Under-18 Select Team at the Under-18 Series vs. Canada, participated in USA Hockey's 2016 Women's National Festival, and attended the 2016 Girls Select U18 Player Development Camp.

Career statistics

Regular season and playoffs

International

Personal life 
Hughes is the daughter of Miki and Terry Hughes. Her mother played volleyball at Minnesota State University. Her father is a former All-American Minnesota State hockey letterman. She has two brothers, Trey and Collin. She majors in Integrated Education Special Education at UMD.

References

1999 births
Living people
American women's ice hockey forwards
Minnesota Duluth Bulldogs women's ice hockey players
People from Lino Lakes, Minnesota